"Booty Wurk (One Cheek at a Time)" is a song by T-Pain featuring Nappy Boy Entertainment artist Joey Galaxy. It was released as a single on June 7, 2011, and originally served as the second single off T-Pain's fourth studio album RevolveЯ. However, the song was later excluded from the album's track listing. It was later included on T-Pain Presents Happy Hour: The Greatest Hits. The song was produced by Young Fyre.

Music video
On June 20, 2011, the official music video for "Booty Wurk (One Cheek at a Time)" was uploaded to YouTube. It features an appearance by comedian Kevin Hart. The video was directed by Erik White.

Track listing
Digital download
"Booty Wurk (One Cheek at a Time)" [feat. Joey Galaxy] – 3:55

Chart positions

Release history

References

2011 singles
T-Pain songs
Music videos directed by Erik White
Songs written by T-Pain
2011 songs
Jive Records singles
Konvict Muzik singles